The Regime (stylized as The ReGime) is an American hip hop collective created by Yukmouth in 1997, and originally included fellow rappers Tech N9ne, Phats Bossi, Madmax, Poppa LQ, Dizzle Don and Govnormatic. Not long after the original formation, Gonzoe of rap group Kausion and Lil Ke also joined. The group is signed to Yukmouth's Smoke-A-Lot Records, and share that label's dragon logo.

The Regime is unique when it comes to rap groups in that the members are from different states and cities around the U.S.. Besides guest appearances on numerous Yukmouth related projects, the group has released three mixtapes in the All Out War series and have plans for their debut album to be titled Regime Dragon Gang.

Group members

Current members 

Ampichino
Basek
BG Bulletwound
Boss Tone
Big Rae
Bueno
C-Bo
Chase D.O.E.
Chino Nino
Digital Top Hat
Dizzle Don
DJ Fingaz
Don Menace
DORASEL
Dru Down
Mr.
Freeze
 The Gatlin
Gov Matic
Grant Rice
Jamal
 Jay R Jay
K.P.
Kuzzo Fly
Kenny Kingpin
Lee Majors
Marc Shyst
Messy Marv
Monsta Ganjah
Ms. Story
Rahmean
Slam Versatile
Smiggz
Tech N9ne
The Reason
The Fleet
T-Lew
Young Bossi
Yukmouth
Phats Bossalini
Mad Maxx
Lil Ke

Former members 
Tha Realest
Don Stryke
E-Blak
J-Stone
Gonzoe (deceased)
Mr. Malik
Nyce
Pretty Black
Yung Skrilla

Discography

Studio albums 
 Dragon Gang (2013)

Side projects 
 Lil Ke & Mad Max – The Regime Presents Thugg Lordz (2001)

Mixtapes 
 All Out War, Volume 1 (2005)
 All Out War, Volume 2 (2005)
 All Out War, Volume 3 (2006)
 The Last Dragon (2013)

References

External links 
 
 

Hip hop groups from California
Musical groups established in 1997
Hip hop collectives
Musical quartets
African-American musical groups
Musical groups from Oakland, California